In Chinese philosophy, a taijitu  is a symbol or diagram representing Taiji in both its monist (wuji) and its dualist (yin and yang) aspects. Such a diagram was first introduced by Neo-Confucian philosopher Zhou Dunyi (1017–1073) of the Song Dynasty in his Taijitu shuo.

The modern Taoist canon, compiled during the Ming era, has at least half a dozen variants of such taijitu. The two most similar are the "Taiji Primal Heaven" and the "wuji" diagrams, both of which have been extensively studied during the Qing period for their possible connection with Zhou Dunyi's taijitu.

Ming period author Lai Zhide (1525–1604) simplified the taijitu to a design of two interlocking spirals. In the Ming era, the combination of the two interlocking spirals of the taijitu with two black-and-white dots superimposed on them became identified with the He tu or "Yellow River diagram". This version was reported in Western literature of the late 19th century as the "Great Monad", and has been widely popularised in Western popular culture as the "yin-yang symbol" since the 1960s. The contemporary Chinese term for the modern symbol is  "two-part Taiji diagram".

Ornamental patterns with visual similarity to the "yin-yang symbol" are found in archaeological artefacts of European prehistory; such designs are sometimes descriptively dubbed "yin yang symbols" in archaeological literature by modern scholars.

Structure 
The taijitu consists of five parts. Strictly speaking, the "yin and yang symbol", itself popularly called taijitu, represents the second of these five parts of the diagram.

At the top, an empty circle depicts the absolute (Wuji)
A second circle represents the Taiji as harboring Dualism, yin and yang, represented by filling the circle in a black-and-white pattern. In some diagrams, there is a smaller empty circle at the center of this, representing Emptiness as the foundation of duality.
Below this second circle is a five-part diagram representing the Five Agents (Wuxing), representing a further stage in the differentiation of Unity into Multiplicity. The Five Agents are connected by lines indicating their proper sequence,  Wood (木) → Fire (火) → Earth (土) → Metal (金) → Water (水).
The circle below the Five Agents represents the conjunction of Heaven and Earth, which in turn gives rise to the "ten thousand things". This stage is also represented by the Eight Trigrams (Bagua).
The final circle represents the state of multiplicity, glossed  "The ten thousand things are born by transformation" (萬物化生; simplified 化生万物)

History 

The term taijitu in modern Chinese is commonly used to mean the simple "divided circle" form, but it may refer to any of several schematic diagrams that contain at least one circle with an inner pattern of symmetry representing yin and yang.

Song and Yuan eras 

While the concept of yin and yang dates to Chinese antiquity, the interest in "diagrams" (圖 tú) is an intellectual fashion of Neo-Confucianism during the Song period (11th century), and it declined again in the Ming period, by the 16th century. During the Mongol Empire and Yuan dynasty, Taoist traditions and diagrams were compiled and published in the encyclopedia Shilin Guangji by Chen Yuanjing.

The original description of a taijitu is due to Song era philosopher Zhou Dunyi (1017–1073), author of the Taijitu shuo  "Explanation of the Diagram of the Supreme Ultimate", which became the cornerstone of Neo-Confucianist cosmology. His brief text synthesized aspects of Chinese Buddhism and Taoism with metaphysical discussions in the Yijing.

Zhou's key terms Wuji and Taiji appear in the opening line , which Adler notes could also be translated "The Supreme Polarity that is Non-Polar".
Non-polar (wuji) and yet Supreme Polarity (taiji)! The Supreme Polarity in activity generates yang; yet at the limit of activity it is still. In stillness it generates yin; yet at the limit of stillness it is also active. Activity and stillness alternate; each is the basis of the other. In distinguishing yin and yang, the Two Modes are thereby established. The alternation and combination of yang and yin generate water, fire, wood, metal, and earth. With these five [phases of] qi harmoniously arranged, the Four Seasons proceed through them. The Five Phases are simply yin and yang; yin and yang are simply the Supreme Polarity; the Supreme Polarity is fundamentally Non-polar. [Yet] in the generation of the Five Phases, each one has its nature.
Instead of usual Taiji translations "Supreme Ultimate" or "Supreme Pole", Adler uses "Supreme Polarity" (see Robinet 1990) because Zhu Xi describes it as the alternating principle of yin and yang, and:
insists that taiji is not a thing (hence "Supreme Pole" will not do). Thus, for both Zhou and Zhu, taiji is the yin-yang principle of bipolarity, which is the most fundamental ordering principle, the cosmic "first principle." Wuji as "non-polar" follows from this. 

Since the 12th century, there has been a vigorous discussion in Chinese philosophy regarding the ultimate origin of Zhou Dunyi's diagram.
Zhu Xi (12th century) insists that Zhou Dunyi had composed the diagram himself, against the prevailing view that he had received it from Daoist sources. Zhu Xi could not accept a Daoist origin of the design, because it would have undermined the claim of uniqueness attached to the Neo-Confucian concept of dao.

Ming and Qing eras 

While Zhou Dunyi (1017–1073) popularized the circular diagram, the introduction of "swirling" patterns first appears in the Ming period.

Zhao Huiqian (趙撝謙, 1351–1395) was the first to introduce the "swirling" variant of the taijitu in his Liushu benyi (六書本義, 1370s). The diagram is combined with the eight trigrams (bagua) and called the "River Chart spontaneously generated by Heaven and Earth".
By the end of the Ming period, this diagram had become a widespread representation of Chinese cosmology.

The dots were introduced in the later Ming period (replacing the droplet-shapes used earlier, in the 16th century) and are encountered more frequently in the Qing period. The dots represent the seed of yin within yang and the seed of yang within yin; the idea that neither can exist without the other.

Lai Zhide's design is similar to the gakyil (dga' 'khyil or "wheel of joy") symbols of Tibetan Buddhism; but while the Tibetan designs have three or four swirls (representing the Three Jewels or the Four Noble Truths, i.e. as a triskele and a tetraskelion design), Lai Zhide's taijitu has two swirls, terminating in a central circle.

Modern yin-yang symbol 
The Ming-era design of the taijitu of two interlocking spirals was a common yin-yang symbol in the first half of the 20th century. The flag of South Korea, originally introduced as the flag of Joseon era Korea in 1882, shows this symbol in red and blue. This was a modernisation of the older (early 19th century) form of the Bat Quai Do used as the Joseon royal standard.

Since the 1960s, the He tu symbol, which combines the two interlocking spirals with two dots, has more commonly been used as a yin-yang symbol.
compare  with 

In the standard form of the contemporary symbol, one draws on the diameter of a circle two non-overlapping circles each of which has a diameter equal to the radius of the outer circle. One keeps the line that forms an "S", and one erases or obscures the other line. The design is also described as a "pair of fishes nestling head to tail against each other".

The Soyombo symbol of Mongolia may be prior to 1686.
It combines several abstract shapes, including a Taiji symbol illustrating the mutual complement of man and woman. In socialist times, it was alternatively interpreted as two fish symbolizing vigilance, because fish never close their eyes.

The modern symbol has also been widely used in martial arts, particularly t'ai chi ch'uan (Taijiquan), and Jeet Kune Do, since the 1970s.
In this context, it is generally used to represent the interplay between hard and soft techniques.

The dots in the modern "yin-yang symbol" have been given the additional interpretation of "intense interaction" between the complementary principles, i.e. a flux or flow to achieve harmony and balance.

Similar symbols 

Similarities can be seen in Neolithic–Eneolithic era Cucuteni–Trypillia culture on the territory of current Ukraine and Romania. Patterns containing ornament looking like Taijitu from archeological artifacts of that culture were displayed in the Ukraine pavilion at the Expo 2010 in Shanghai, China.

The interlocking design is found in artifacts of the European Iron Age. Similar interlocking designs are found in the Americas: Xicalcoliuhqui.

While this design appears to become a standard ornamental motif in Iron-Age Celtic culture by the 3rd century BC, found on a wide variety of artifacts, it is not clear what symbolic value was attached to it. Unlike the Chinese symbol, the Celtic yin-yang lack the element of mutual penetration, and the two halves are not always portrayed in different colors. Comparable designs are also found in Etruscan art.

In computing 
Unicode features the he tu symbol in the Miscellaneous Symbols block, at code point . The related "double body symbol" is included at U+0FCA  (TIBETAN SYMBOL NOR BU NYIS -KHYIL ࿊), in the Tibetan block.
The Soyombo symbol, that includes a taijitu, is available in Unicode as the sequence U+11A9E 𑪞 + U+11A9F 𑪟 + U+11AA0 𑪠.

See also 
Gankyil
Taegukgi
Taegeuk
Three hares
Tomoe
Triskelion
Koru
Lauburu

References

Sources

External links 

 Where does the Chinese Yin Yang Symbol Come From? – chinesefortunecalendar.com
 Chart of the Great Ultimate (Taiji tu) – goldenelixir.com)

Iconography
Ornaments
Rotational symmetry
Symbols
Taoist cosmology
Visual motifs
eo:Jino kaj Jango#Tajĝifiguro